Germán Amed Valdez Nate Rosario (born November 20, 1995) is a Dominican professional baseball shortstop and outfielder for the Cleveland Guardians of Major League Baseball (MLB). He made his MLB debut with the New York Mets in 2017.

Career

New York Mets
Rosario signed with the New York Mets as an international free agent in July 2012 for $1.75 million. It was the largest international signing bonus given by the Mets. Rosario made his professional debut in 2013 with the Kingsport Mets. He started 2014 with the Brooklyn Cyclones and was promoted to the Savannah Sand Gnats in September. Rosario was promoted to the Binghamton Mets on June 23, 2016.  He was named to the 2016 MLB All Star Futures Game and went 1-for-2 in the game. Rosario ended 2016 with a .324 batting average, 5 home runs, and 71 RBIs.

The Mets added Rosario to their 40-man roster after the 2016 season.  Rosario was assigned to the Las Vegas 51s of the Class AAA Pacific Coast League to start the 2017 season.  In April 2017, Rosario was declared the top prospect in baseball by writer Keith Law.  Rosario was named to the Triple-A All-Star Game and the All-Star Futures Game for 2017.  Rosario earned Pacific Coast League All-Star honors as well as being awarded the 2017 PCL Rookie of the Year.

Rosario made his MLB debut on August 1, 2017 against the Colorado Rockies at Coors Field. In that game, Rosario recorded his first career Major League hit off of Scott Oberg. On August 11, 2017, Rosario hit his first career Major League home run off of Héctor Neris. He had his first career multi-home run game on May 20, 2018, hitting two home runs against the Arizona Diamondbacks.

In 2019, he batted .287/.323/.432 with 15 home runs and 72 RBIs, and while he stole 19 bases he tied for the major league lead in caught stolen with 10. He had the lowest pull percentage of all NL batters (30.4%). On defense in 2019, he had -10 Defensive Runs Saved (DRS), the worst in the National League among qualifying shortstops. However, Rosario led the National League in singles.

On August 28, 2020, Rosario hit a walk-off home run against the New York Yankees at Yankee Stadium. The Mets were the home team because they were making up for a previously cancelled game. It was the first time a visiting player had hit a walk-off home run since Ed McKean hit one for the St. Louis Perfectos against the Cleveland Spiders in 1899. During the 2020 season, Rosario hit .252/.272/.371 with 4 home runs and 15 RBIs in 46 games.

Cleveland Indians / Guardians
On January 7, 2021, the Mets traded Rosario, Andrés Giménez, Josh Wolf, and Isaiah Greene to the Cleveland Indians for Francisco Lindor and Carlos Carrasco. In March 2021, the Indians began transitioning Rosario into a role as an outfielder with the help of coach Kyle Hudson, implicitly giving the starting shortstop job to Giménez. During Rosario's first three innings in the outfield during a spring training game, he committed three errors which led to eight unearned runs being scored. Rosario's only prior experience in the outfield was three innings spent in left field with the Mets in 2019. Giménez was demoted to the minors on May 18. Around that same time, Rosario became the team's regular starting shortstop. On August 31 against the Kansas City Royals, Rosario went 5-for-5 with a career-high 5 RBIs. It included two home runs, one being the first inside-the-park home run in his career. Rosario finished the 2021 season batting .282/.321/.409 with 11 home runs, 57 RBIs, 77 runs and 13 stolen bases in 141 games.

In 2022 he led the major leagues with nine triples, and had the lowest walk percentage among major league batters (3.7%), while batting .283/.312/.403 with 86 runs, 11 home runs, and 18 steals in 22 attempts. He led the major leagues in infield hits, with 35.

International career
On October 29, 2018, he was selected to play for the MLB All-Stars during the 2018 MLB Japan All-Star Series.

References

External links

 

1995 births
Living people
Binghamton Mets players
Brooklyn Cyclones players
Cleveland Guardians players
Cleveland Indians players
Dominican Republic expatriate baseball players in the United States
Kingsport Mets players
Las Vegas 51s players
Major League Baseball players from the Dominican Republic
Major League Baseball shortstops
New York Mets players
Sportspeople from Santo Domingo
Savannah Sand Gnats players
St. Lucie Mets players